Lingui District is the county seat and district administered by Guilin, Guangxi, China, and located midway between Guilin and Yangshuo.  The district is mostly rural and hilly, marked by the same dramatic karst topography for which Guilin is famous. Tourist attractions include Snake World, Xiongsheng Tiger and Bear Village, and Crocodile Kingdom.

The district is also known as a center of luohan guo (Siraitia grosvenorii) production.

Olympic diver Li Ting is a native of Lingui.

History
The Shiji and Hanshu state that around 104 BCE, the Han first built fortifications west of the district of Lingui and established the province of Jiuquan (in modern-day Gansu) to facilitate a safe route to
the lands of the northwest along the Silk Road. As a result, more and more envoys were sent through this territory to Anxi, Yancai, Lixuan, Tiaozhi, and Shendu.

Administrative divisions
The district administers 8 towns, 1 township and 2 ethnic townships:

Towns:
Lingui Town, Liutang, Huixian, Liangjiang, Wutong, Sitang Town, Zhongyong Town, Nanbianshan Town,

Township:
Chadong Township
Ethnic Townships:
Wantian Yao Ethnic Township, Huangsha Yao Ethnic Township

Footnotes

References
Hill, John E. (2009) Through the Jade Gate to Rome: A Study of the Silk Routes during the Later Han Dynasty, 1st to 2nd Centuries CE. BookSurge, Charleston, South Carolina. .

External links 
 Photos of Lingui scenery

Administrative divisions of Guilin
County-level divisions of Guangxi